The Climax may refer to:

 The Climax (1944 film), a horror film
 The Climax (1930 film), a thriller film
 The Climax (illustration), a work of art by Aubrey Beardsley

See also
 Climax (disambiguation)